The Blackstone River and Canal Heritage State Park is a part of the state park system of the Commonwealth of Massachusetts, managed by the Massachusetts Department of Conservation and Recreation (DCR). This  park "recalls the role of canals in transporting raw materials and manufactured goods between emerging industrial centers." The Blackstone River and Canal Heritage State Park at Uxbridge, Massachusetts, is the midpoint of the Blackstone River Valley National Heritage Corridor of the National Park System. The Blackstone River and Valley is where the industrial revolution was born in America. The southern entrance to this state park is the site of the historic Stanley Woolen Mill, currently being redeveloped for commercial and tourism. The Native American Nipmuc name for the village here was "Wacentug", translated as "bend in the river".

History

The Blackstone Canal
Transportation of goods from the upper Blackstone Valley was a growing concern by 1818. Teamsters drove huge wagons of textile goods to Woonsocket and to Worcester. John Brown, a Providence Merchant, envisioned the Blackstone Canal from the late 18th century. The Erie Canal was built in Upstate New York, just prior to the construction of the Blackstone Canal. The need for inland transportation from Worcester to Providence finally gave way to an inland waterway, the Blackstone Canal (1828). The  canal connected  Worcester to Providence, the closest port. One theory holds that rival industrialists may have prompted the building of the canal to "restrict water rights" for competitors (water powered mills). The canal was built by imported Irish laborers, who worked on the Erie Canal and settled here. It was completed in 1828. The canal was a simple ditch alongside the Blackstone River with a dirt tow path for boats to be pulled by horses.  A granite lock stands at Goat Hill, and Uxbridge was the overnight stopping point. The canal connected inland Worcester mills on the Blackstone and Providence where thousands of tons of textiles could be exported all over the world. But, by 1832, the Boston and Worcester Railroad began to carry freight to Boston and the role for the canal diminished. Similar canals were built in the first half of the 19th century including others that have become National Historic Corridors, such as the Illinois and Michigan Canal in northeast Illinois.

In 1847, the Providence and Worcester Railroad opened and completely replaced the canal for transportation. The transformation of transportation from horse drawn teams (origin of the word "teamsters"), to canal barges, to railroads was complete.

Features
There are interpretive services at the park. There are trails that recreate the trails that the Nipmuc, the Native American people of central Massachusetts, used. The River Bend Farm Visitor Center provides a convenient gateway to canoeing, fishing, trails, and snowmobiling or cross-country skiing access. National Park Service rangers explain the local history at the River Bend Farm Visitors Center. Nearby Goat Hill provides scenic views and views of remnants of the canal locks and towpaths which can be found here. The nearby Lookout Rock also provides scenic views of the valley and the winding Blackstone River.

Nearby attractions and features of the park
The area includes Rice City and Goat Hill. There is an abundance of wildlife available for viewing. The state park works closely in conjunction with the nearby National Park Service. The Blackstone River Bikeway, now under construction, and the Blackstone Canal towpath, are both slated to be component parts or segments of the  East Coast Greenway. Outdoor activities are also available at the nearby West Hill Dam and Park.

See also
Uxbridge, Massachusetts
Blackstone Valley
West Hill Dam
Stanley Woolen Mill

Photos

References

External links

Blackstone River and Canal Heritage State Park Department of Conservation and Recreation 
Blackstone River and Canal Heritage State Park Map Department of Conservation and Recreation 
John H. Chafee Blackstone River Valley National Heritage Corridor National Park Service
Historic American Buildings Survey Library of Congress
Stone Arch Bridge across Blackstone Canal Asgreev Photos 
Highway of Commerce: The Blackstone Canal Worcester Historical Museum

State parks of Massachusetts
Massachusetts natural resources
Uxbridge, Massachusetts
History of transportation in the United States
Parks in Worcester County, Massachusetts